The Büchenberg Pit is an old iron ore mine in the Harz Mountains of Germany that is operated today as a show mine. It is located in the village of Büchenberg in the municipality of Oberharz am Brocken in the state of Saxony-Anhalt.

Hiking 
The pit is no. 37 in the Harzer Wandernadel network of hiking checkpoints.

References

External links 

Homepage of the show mine

Oberharz am Brocken
Show mines